Lie sphere may refer to:

 Lie-sphere, the fourth type of classical bounded symmetric domain
 Lie sphere geometry